Anton Hertl (12 May 1921 – 10 September 2001) was an Austrian gymnast. He competed in eight events at the 1960 Summer Olympics.

References

External links

1921 births
2001 deaths
Austrian male artistic gymnasts
Olympic gymnasts of Austria
Gymnasts at the 1960 Summer Olympics
Sportspeople from Graz
20th-century Austrian people